The women's pentathlon at the 1969 European Athletics Championships was held in Athens, Greece, at Georgios Karaiskakis Stadium on 18 September 1969.

Medalists

Results

Final
18 September

Participation
According to an unofficial count, 12 athletes from 9 countries participated in the event.

 (1)
 (1)
 (2)
 (1)
 (1)
 (1)
 (2)
 (2)
 (1)

References

Pentathlon
Combined events at the European Athletics Championships
Euro